Ramonye is a rural locality (a selo) and the administrative center of Ramonskoye Rural Settlement, Anninsky District, Voronezh Oblast, Russia. The population was 864 as of 2010. There are 15 streets.

Geography 
Ramonye is located 55 km east of Anna (the district's administrative centre) by road. Gusevka is the nearest rural locality.

References 

Rural localities in Anninsky District